Franklin Sprague may refer to:

 Frank J. Sprague (1857–1934), American naval officer and inventor 
 Franklin B. Sprague (1825–1895), American military officer, businessman and judge